TRT Müzik is a Turkish television channel owned and operated by TRT. It broadcasts music programmes featuring music news magazines and talk shows. TRT Müzik can also be watched on TRT 4.

References

External links 

  

Turkish-language television stations
Television stations in Turkey
Television channels and stations established in 2009
2009 establishments in Turkey
Music television channels
Turkish Radio and Television Corporation
Music organizations based in Turkey